Damu is a poorly documented Tani (Sino-Tibetan) language spoken in Tibet. Only 80 speakers of this language were reported to exist in 1985, and the language community was experiencing strong language contact with speakers of Bodic languages at that time. No documentation or description of the Damu language other than some brief remarks and a wordlist in Ouyang (1985) appears to exist, and it is not known whether the Damu community is still intact and speaking their language.

The precise genetic affiliation of Damu remains unclear. Although Sun (1993) clearly identified Damu as a member of the Tani languages, he noted some difficulties that prevented its precise alignment within either Western Tani or Eastern Tani. In addition, Sun speculated that Damu might represent a northern variety of the Tangam language. Post (2013a) concluded that Tangam and Damu are in fact distinct, despite sharing a number of features. In particular, both Tangam and Damu share an early sound change which would suggest aligning them with Western Tani, despite sharing an overall Eastern Tani–like profile.

References

 Ouyang, Jueya (1985). 珞巴族语言简志(崩尼-博嘎尔语) [Luobazu Yuyan Jianzhi (Bengni Boga'eryu)/Brief Description of the Luoba Nationality Language (The Bengni-Bokar Language)]. Beijing, 民族出版社 [Minzu Chubanshe/Nationalities Press].
 Post, Mark W. (2013a). 'The Tangam language of Kugɨŋ Təəraŋ.' Paper presented at the 46th International Conference of Sino-Tibetan Languages and Linguistics. Hanover, Dartmouth College, Jul 10.
 Post, Mark W. (2013b). 'Defoliating the Tani Stammbaum: An exercise in areal linguistics.' Paper presented at the 13th Himalayan Languages Symposium. Canberra, Australian National University, Aug 9.
 Sun, Tian-Shin Jackson (1993). A Historical-Comparative Study of the Tani (Mirish) Branch of Tibeto-Burman. PhD Dissertation. Department of Linguistics. Berkeley, University of California.

Tani languages